The 1988 UC Santa Barbara Gauchos football team represented the University of California, Santa Barbara (UCSB) as an independent during the 1988 NCAA Division III football season. Led by third-year head coach Mike Warren, the Gauchos compiled a record of 6–4 and outscored their opponents 189 to 176 for the season. The team played home games at Harder Stadium in Santa Barbara, California.

Schedule

References

UC Santa Barbara
UC Santa Barbara Gauchos football seasons
UC Santa Barbara Gauchos football